An Post–Chain Reaction is a UCI continental professional cycling team registered in the Republic of Ireland, based at the Sean Kelly Academy in Merchtem, Flanders. The team participates on the UCI Europe Tour. The squad is managed by Kurt Bogaerts and Sean Kelly with directeur sportif Andy Vanhoudt. The team disbanded at the end of the 2017 season, after they failed to find sponsorship.

History 
The team began in 2006 with the name Sean Kelly ACLVB–M Donnelly as the first Irish professional cycling team. Shortly after its launch another Irish continental team was launched, Murphy & Gunn–Newlyn. For the 2007 season, these two teams merged to form the Murphy & Gunn–Newlyn–M Donnelly–Sean Kelly squad. The team achieved several good results including second overall in the Rás Tailteann with Paídi O'Brien. At the end of 2007, it was announced that An Post would replace Murphy & Gunn as main sponsor while Grant Thornton replacing the Newlyn group as a co-sponsor. For the 2008 season, the team became more international with four Belgians, two Britons, one Swede and one German joining the six Irish riders. The team took its biggest win when Stephen Gallagher won the general classification of the Rás Tailteann. It has also taken overall victories in Vuelta a Extremadura (Daniel Lloyd), Tour des Pyrénées (Daniel Fleeman), and Ronde de l'Oise (Steven Van Vooren).

The team began as an Irish-registered team, becoming Belgian-registered between 2010 and 2013, primarily to gain access to races in Belgium. The team became Irish-registered again in 2014.

After failing to find sponsorship for the 2018 season, the team was forced to disband. Despite this the team are still looking for sponsorship to compete in the 2018 season.

UCI Europe tour 
The SKT team was UCI ranked 31st out of 125 teams at the end of the 2009 UCI Europe Tour season with 481 points. The team was ranked 46th out of 110 teams on the UCI Europe Tour rankings for 2010 with 314 points. It improved ranking to 21st out of 114 teams in 2011 with 648 points, with the team's highest points scorers being Mark McNally with 125 and Andrew Fenn, who scored 122. The team had their best ever season in 2012, finishing 16th out of 125 teams in the final rankings on 879 points. Gediminas Bagdonas was the team's highest points scorer with 346 points, a tally that was good enough to put him in tenth place in the individual standings. Niko Eeckhout contributed 187 points to the tally, while Kenneth Vanbilsen scored 131. In 2013 the team finished 28th overall with a total of 341 points.

Team roster 
As at 31 December 2017

Major wins 

2008
Overall Vuelta a Extremadura, Daniel Lloyd
Stage 1, Team Time Trial
Overall FBD Insurance Rás, Stephen Gallagher
Overall Tour des Pyrénées, Daniel Fleeman

2009
Stages 4 & 5 Vuelta a Extremadura, Niko Eeckhout
Stage 1 FBD Insurance Rás, Niko Eeckhout
Overall Ronde de l'Oise, Steven Van Vooren
Grote Prijs Stad Zottegem, Niko Eeckhout
Memorial Rik Van Steenbergen, Niko Eeckhout

2010
 Irish Road Race Championship, Matt Brammeier
Stage 5 Étoile de Bessèges, Niko Eeckhout
Stage 3 Ronde de l'Oise, Niko Eeckhout
Stage 3 FBD Insurance Rás, David O'Loughlin
Stage 7 FBD Insurance Rás, Mark Cassidy

2011
 Time Trial Championships, Gediminas Bagdonas
Stage 2 Driedaagse van West-Vlaanderen, Niko Eeckhout
Stage 7 Tour de Bretagne Cycliste, Andrew Fenn
Overall An Post Rás, Gediminas Bagdonas
Stages 2 & 4, Gediminas Bagdonas
Memorial Van Coningsloo, Andrew Fenn
Overall Ronde de l'Oise, Gediminas Bagdonas
Stage 2, Gediminas Bagdonas
GP Stad Geel, Sam Bennett
Overall Mi-Août en Bretagne, Mark McNally
Stage 7 Tour of Britain, Gediminas Bagdonas

2012
 Road Race Championships, Gediminas Bagdonas
Kattekoers, Roy Jans
Ronde van Noord-Holland, Gediminas Bagdonas
Omloop der Kempen, Niko Eeckhout
Stages 3 & 8 An Post Rás, Gediminas Bagdonas
Memorial Van Coningsloo, Gediminas Bagdonas
Schaal Sels, Niko Eeckhout

2013
Stage 5 Tour of Britain, Sam Bennett
Stage 2 An Post Rás, Shane Archbold
Stages 3 & 8 An Post Rás, Sam Bennett
Stage 2 Ronde de l'Oise, Glenn O'Shea
 Under-23 Road Race Championships, Jack Wilson

2014
Stage 1 An Post Rás, Robert-Jon McCarthy
 Under-23 Time Trial Championships, Ryan Mullen
 Road Race Championships, Ryan Mullen
 Under-23 Road Race Championships, Ryan Mullen

2015
Stage 3 Tour d'Azerbaïdjan, Josh Edmondson
Stages 2 & 5 An Post Rás, Aaron Gate
Stages 4 & 8 An Post Rás, Aidis Kruopis
Overall Ronde de l'Oise, Josh Edmondson
Stage 4, Josh Edmondson
 Time Trial Championships, Ryan Mullen
 Road Race Championships, Aidis Kruopis
Antwerpse Havenpijl, Aidis Kruopis

2017
 Under-23 Time Trial Championships, Regan Gough
 Under-23 Road Race Championships, Regan Gough
Stage 1 Tour du Loir et Cher, Damien Shaw
Stage 5 Tour de Bretagne, Przemysław Kasperkiewicz
Stage 3 An Post Rás, Matthew Teggart
Stage 5 An Post Rás, Regan Gough
Stage 8 An Post Rás, Przemysław Kasperkiewicz

National champions 
2010
 Ireland Road Race Matt Brammeier

2011
 Lithuania Time Trial Gediminas Bagdonas

2012
 Lithuania Road Race Gediminas Bagdonas

2013
 Ireland Under-23 Road Race Jack Wilson

2014
 Ireland Under-23 Time Trial Ryan Mullen
 Ireland Road Race Ryan Mullen
 Ireland Under-23 Road Race Ryan Mullen

2015
 Ireland Time Trial Ryan Mullen
 Lithuania Road Race Aidis Kruopis

2017
 New Zealand Under-23 Time Trial, Regan Gough
 New Zealand Under-23 Road Race, Regan Gough

References

External links 

 

Cycling teams based in Ireland
UCI Continental Teams (Europe)
Cycling teams established in 2006
Cycling teams disestablished in 2017